Jakob Emanuel Handmann (16 August 1718 in Basel – 3 November 1781 in Bern) was a Swiss painter specialised in portrait painting. He was a contemporary of the Swiss painters Anton Graff, Jean Preudhomme, Angelica Kauffman, Johann Jakob Schalch,  Johann Caspar Füssli and his son Johann Heinrich Füssli.

Life and work

Jakob Emanuel Handmann was the 9th child of Johann Jakob Handmann, a baker and later bailiff of Waldenburg, and his wife Anna Maria Rispach. Between 1735 and 1739 he made an apprenticeship as a stucco plasterer and studied painting in Schaffhausen with the painter and stucco plasterer Johann Ulrich Schnetzler. 

He made study trips to Paris, Rome and Naples. In Paris he worked at the studio of Jean Restout II who influenced his work. In 1742 Handmann travelled through France finding employment in a portrait studio partnership with the painter Hörling. In the business partnership with Hörling Handmann was mainly responsible for painting the heads of the sitters. In Italy he worked among others in the studios of Marco Benefial and Pierre Subleyras in Rome. There he mainly copied masterpieces from the Classical Antiquity and Renaissance periods.

By June 1746 he was back in Switzerland. In 1747 he settled down in Basel. In Basel he opened his own studio. However, many of his clients were patricians from the city and the area of Bern. Thanks to the acquaintance of the Estonian nobleman Colonel Carl Friedrich von Staal, Handmann became a member of the “Accademia Clementina” of Bologna in 1773. Apart from a trip to Germany in 1753 he never again left his native country.

Gallery

Literature and references 

 Thieme-Becker: Allgemeines Lexikon der bildenden Künstler von der Antike bis zur Gegenwart, Leipzig: Seemann, 1907–1950; Taschenbuchausgabe: München: DTV (1992) 
 Thomas Freivogel: Emanuel Handmann 1718–1781 – Ein Basler Porträtist im Bern des ausgehenden Rokoko, Licorne-Verlag (2002) 
 Thomas Freivogel: Emanuel Handmann – beliebtester Porträtist der Familie Tscharner! (online)
 Thomas Freivogel: Zwei Friedrich-Bildnisse von Emanuel Handmann. In: Jürgen Ziechmann (Hrsg.): Fridericianische Miniaturen Bd. 2 (OLDENBURG 1991), S. 189-201

External links 

 https://archive.today/20130101082009/http://www.khist.unizh.ch/static/Biblio/FV/EH_Buchanzeige.htm (German)

1718 births
1781 deaths
18th-century Swiss painters
18th-century Swiss male artists
Swiss male painters
Swiss portrait painters
Artists from Bern
Artists from Basel-Stadt